Dana Cuff is an American architecture theorist, professor of Architecture and Urban Design and founding director of cityLAB at the University of California, Los Angeles (UCLA).

She received her Ph.D. in Architecture from University of California, Berkeley and her B.A., Psychology and Design from University of California, Santa Cruz. She is the author of books including Fast Forward Urbanism (Princeton Architectural Press, 2011) and The Provisional City (MIT Press, 2000).

She has been awarded the 2004 Lise Meitner Endowed Chair at Lund University in Sweden and was the 2004–2006 Fellow of the Ziman Center for Real Estate at UCLA. In 2019, she also received the Women in Architecture Activist of the Year award and an international prize for Researcher of the Year.

Publications 
 Architecture: The Story of Practice, MIT Press, 1991. 
 The Provisional City: Los Angeles Stories of Architecture and Urbanism, MIT Press, 2000. 
 Fast Forward Urbanism with Roger Sherman, Princeton Architectural Press, 2011. 
Urban Humanities: New Practices for Reimagining the City with Anastasia Loukaitou-Sideris, Todd Presner, Maite Zubiaurre, and Jonathan Jae-an Crisman, MIT Press, 2020.

References

External links 
UCLA biography
Cuff at cityLAB
Cuff at UCLA Architecture and Urban Design

Living people
UCLA School of the Arts and Architecture faculty
UC Berkeley College of Environmental Design alumni
University of California, Santa Cruz alumni
American women architects
Architects from California
Year of birth missing (living people)
American women academics
21st-century American women